David Philip King (born 3 September 1990) is an English footballer who plays for Oxford City as a midfielder.

Career

King made his debut for MK Dons, coming on as a substitute in the 2–1 defeat to Cardiff City in the League Cup on 26 August 2008.

In October 2009, King joined Conference National side Forest Green Rovers on a one-month loan. He made his debut for Forest Green on 3 October 2009 as a substitute on 77 minutes in a 1–0 away defeat against Mansfield Town. King's loan spell was terminated in December 2009. Along with three other players, he was released by MK Dons at the end of his contract on 30 June 2010. He then signed for Boreham Wood.

In July 2012, it was announced that King had signed for Southern Premier Division side Hemel Hempstead Town.

In September 2015, Southern Premier Division side Oxford City FC announced the signing of King with a number of other clubs looking in to him.

King suffered an shoulder injury during 2015 leaving him out for about 2 months. Many football league clubs were interested in King.

References

External links

David King's player profile at mkdons.com

1990 births
Living people
English footballers
Milton Keynes Dons F.C. players
Forest Green Rovers F.C. players
Boreham Wood F.C. players
Hemel Hempstead Town F.C. players
National League (English football) players
Association football midfielders